Mullah Abdul Manan Omari is an Afghan senior leader of the Taliban and current Minister of Public Works for the Islamic Emirate of Afghanistan since 7 September 2021. He is also a central member of the negotiation team in Qatar office. He is the stepbrother of Mullah Omar.

In 2016, Abdul Manan was appointed as chief of the Taliban's religious affairs and Dawah as well as a member of the Taliban leadership.

He belongs to the Uruzgan province of Afghanistan.

References

Living people
Taliban government ministers of Afghanistan
People from Urozgan Province
Year of birth missing (living people)